The 2021–22 Binghamton Bearcats men's basketball team represented Binghamton University in the 2021–22 NCAA Division I men's basketball season. They played their home games at the Binghamton University Events Center in Vestal, New York and were led by 1st-year head coach Levell Sanders. They finished the season 12-17, 8-10 in America East Play to finish in 6th place. They defeated New Hampshire in the quarterfinals of the America East tournament before losing in the semifinals to Vermont.

Previous season
In a season limited due to the ongoing COVID-19 pandemic, the Bearcats finished the 2020–21 season 4–14, 4–10 in America East play to finish in ninth place. As the 9th seed in the America East tournament, they lost to 4th seeded Hartford 60–77 in the first round.

On March 1, 2021, the school announced that head coach Tommy Dempsey's contract would not be renewed, and named assistant coach Levell Sanders as the interim head coach for the season, while the school will look for a permanent replacement.

Roster

Schedule and results

|-
!colspan=12 style=| Non-conference regular season

|-
!colspan=12 style=| America East regular season

|-
!colspan=12 style=| America East tournament
|-

Source

References

Binghamton Bearcats men's basketball seasons
Binghamton Bearcats
2021 in sports in New York (state)
2022 in sports in New York (state)